This is a list of former  NTA Film Network affiliates in Canada. The NTA Film Network was an American television network or syndication service which operated from August 1956 to 1961, when the network's flagship station, WNTA-TV, was sold. Although NTA was based in the United States, many Canadian television stations aired NTA programs.

References

Canadian NTA Film Network affiliates
NTA Film Network